Endops yanagisawai is a proetid trilobite belonging to the family Proetidae, endemic to Middle Permian-aged marine strata in Fukushima Prefecture, Japan. It was originally described by Riuji Endo as Paladin yanagisawai.

References
 Proetida fact sheet   
Endops in Paleobiology db 

Permian trilobites
Fossil taxa described in 1962
Proetidae
Proetida genera
Fossils of Japan